23rd Street station is a light rail station on the Muni Metro T Third Street line, located in the median of Third Street in the Dogpatch neighborhood of San Francisco, California. The station opened with the T Third Street line on January 13, 2007. It has two side platforms; the northbound platform is north of 23rd Street, and the southbound platform south of 23rd Street, so that trains can pass through the intersection before the station stop.

References

External links 

SFMTA: Third Street & 23rd St northbound, southbound
SF Bay Transit (unofficial): Third Street & 23rd St

Muni Metro stations
Railway stations in the United States opened in 2007
2007 establishments in California